Lidiya Vitalyevna Yurkova (Cyrillic: Лидия Витальевна Юркова; née Okolo-Kulak, born 15 January 1967 in Mogilev) is a retired Belarusian athlete who specialised in the sprint hurdles. She competed at the 1996 Summer Olympics as well as two indoor and one outdoor World Championships. In addition she won the bronze medal at the 1990 European Championships.

Her personal bests are 12.66 seconds in the 100 metres hurdles (Kiev 1990) and 7.86 seconds in the 60 metres hurdles (Chelyabinsk 1990).

Competition record

References

External links 
 

1967 births
Living people
Soviet female hurdlers
Athletes (track and field) at the 1996 Summer Olympics
Olympic athletes of Belarus
People from Mogilev
Belarusian female hurdlers
World Athletics Championships athletes for Belarus
Universiade medalists in athletics (track and field)
Universiade silver medalists for the Soviet Union
Medalists at the 1989 Summer Universiade
Competitors at the 1987 Summer Universiade
Competitors at the 1990 Goodwill Games
Sportspeople from Mogilev Region